This List of landmarks in Riverside, California includes officially designated federal, state, and local landmarks within the city of Riverside, California, United States, as well as other notable points of interest within the city.  Landmarks that are closely associated with the city, but outside the city's boundaries, have also been included.

List of officially designated landmarks

List of monuments and memorials

List of natural landmarks

Other points of interest

Tallest buildings in Riverside

Proposed
Proposed new buildings in Riverside:

See also
 List of museums in Riverside, California
 California Historical Landmarks in Riverside County, California
 List of Riverside County, California, placename etymologies
 List of California Historical Landmarks
 National Register of Historic Places listings in California
 List of National Historic Landmarks in California
 List of National Natural Landmarks in California

References

Bibliography
 
 Jennings, Bill (Editorial Committee Chairman). Guide To The Historic Landmarks Of Riverside County California, Riverside County Historical Commission Press, Riverside, California, 1993.
 
 Patterson, Tom. Landmarks of Riverside and the Stories Behind Them, The Press-Enterprise Co., 1964. LOC catalog number: 64-15204.

Citations and notes

External links
Landmarks of the City of Riverside
Emporis Riverside

 
Tourist attractions in Riverside, California
Riverside, California
Riverside, California
 
California-related lists